Joan David Mazzaco (born 25 April 2000) is an Argentine professional footballer who plays as a left-back for Rosario Central.

Club career
Mazzaco started his career with Sportivo Díaz, having two spells there either side of a stint with a club in Empalme Villa Constitución. In December 2019, having since completed a move to Rosario Central, Sportivo Díaz were awarded compensation for the development of the left-back - something the player himself questioned, after claiming to be poorly treated financially during his time there. In 2020, for Rosario, he was an unused sub seven times before making his bow, including for the first time in January versus Huracán. At the end of 2020, on 14 December, Mazzaco made his debut in a Copa de la Liga Profesional win over Patronato.

International career
In 2017, Mazzaco represented Argentina at the South American U-17 Championship in Chile. He appeared in matches against Peru and Brazil as they were eliminated at the first hurdle.

Career statistics
.

Notes

References

External links

2000 births
Living people
People from San Jerónimo Department
Argentine footballers
Argentina youth international footballers
Association football defenders
Argentine Primera División players
Rosario Central footballers
Sportspeople from Santa Fe Province